Joseph Daniel Wesley Grandine (November 14, 1860 – January 9, 1950) was an American farmer and politician.

Early life 
Born in Wayne County, New York, Grandine moved with his family to Menasha, Wisconsin, where he attended high school.

Career 
Grandine worked as a farmer in Argonne, Wisconsin. He was president of the North Crandon school board. He unsuccessfully campaigned for the Wisconsin State Assembly in 1912. Grandine served as a Republican in the Wisconsin State Assembly from 1921 to 1929.

Death 
Grandine died at his daughter's house in Rhinelander, Wisconsin.

Notes

External links
 

1860 births
1950 deaths
People from Wayne County, New York
People from Forest County, Wisconsin
Farmers from Wisconsin
School board members in Wisconsin
People from Menasha, Wisconsin
Republican Party members of the Wisconsin State Assembly